Mike Leach  may refer to:

Mike Leach (American football coach) (1961–2022), American college football head coach
Mike Leach (long snapper) (born 1976), American football long snapper
Mike Leach (tennis) (born 1960), tennis player

See also
Mick Leach (1947–1992), English soccer player